This is a list of monarchs and heads of state of Finland; that is, the kings of Sweden with regents and viceroys of the Kalmar Union, the grand dukes of Finland, a title used by most Swedish monarchs, up to the two-year regency following the independence in 1917, with a brief flirtation with a truly domestic monarchy.

Part of the Kingdom of Sweden, from the High Middle Ages until 1809

Finland as an integral part of Sweden under the King of Sweden (Ruotsin kuningas).

Some texts suggest the Swedish rule of Finland started as early as during the Houses of Sverker and Eric (Sverker I of Sweden 1130–1156 and Eric the Saint 1156–1160). But the first historic documents suggesting rule by Swedish kings in Finland not limited to sparse crusades and conquests are dated at around 1249.

The House of Bjelbo
1250–1275 : Valdemar I (Valdemar Birgerinpoika)
regent: Birger Jarl
1275–1284 : Magnus I (Maunu I Ladonlukko)
1284–1291 : Benedict I (Bengt Birgerinpoika )
1291–1302 : Birger (Birger Maununpoika)
1302–1319 : Valdemar II (Valdemar Maununpoika) and his first wife 
1319–1353 : Ingeborg Eriksdottir of Norway, widow of Valdemar II
1353–1356 : Benedict II (Pentti Algotinpoika)
1357-1359 : Eric I
1359 : Magnus II (Maunu II) and Eric I
1359–1364 : Magnus II (Maunu II) and Haakon, sons of Magnus II

The House of Mecklenburg-Schwerin

1364–1395 : Albert, King of Sweden (Albrekt Mecklenburgilainen)

Rulers of the Kalmar Union and Regents (Valtionhoitaja, Riksföreståndare)

1389–1412 : Margaret I of Denmark (Margareeta), widow of King Haakon of Sweden, mother of Olav IV, and heiress of Estonia, a Danish dominion
1396–1439 : Eric II (Eerik XIII Pommerilainen, died 1459), a first cousin twice removed of Haakon I of Sweden
1438–1440 : Carl Knutsson Bonde, Regent (Kaarle Knuutinpoika)
1441–1448 : Christopher of Bavaria (Kristoffer Baijerilainen)
1448–1448 : Regents Bengt and Nils Jönsson Oxenstierna ((Pentti Jönsinpoika Häräntähti and Niilo Jönsinpoika Häräntähti))
1448–1457 : Charles I (Kaarle I Knuutinpoika), he had been 1442–48 chatelain and margrave of Viipuri county
1457–1457 : Regents Jöns Bengtsson Oxenstierna the archbishop and Eric Axelsson Tott ((arkkipiispa Jöns Pentinpoika and herra Eerik Akselinpoika))
1457–1464 : Christian I of Sweden (Kristian I)
1464–1470 : Charles I (restored) 
1470–1497 : Regent Sten Sture the elder (Sten Sture vanhempi) - also, 1483–1501 chatelain and margrave of Viipuri county
1497–1501 : John I (Juhana I)
1501–1503 : Regent Sten Sture the elder (Sten Sture vanhempi)
1504–1511 : Regent Svante Nilsson (Svante Niilonpoika, Ekesiön herra, he did not use the name of Sture)
1512–1512 : Regent Eric Trolle
1512–1520 : Regent Sten Sture the younger (Sten Sture nuorempi, he took the name of Sture of his great-grandmother's family, for image reasons and for its prestige)
1520–1521 : Christian II of Sweden (Kristian II)

The House of Vasa

1521–1560 : Gustav I (Kustaa I Vaasa)
1560–1569 : Eric XIV (Eerik XIV)
1569–1592 : John III (restored), adopted title Grand Prince of Finland (Suomen suuriruhtinas) around 1580
1592–1599 : Sigismund (Sigismund) (titled Grand Prince of Finland) and John III (Juhana III)
1599-1606 : John III (Juhana III)
1606–1632 : Gustav II Adolph the Great (Kustaa II Aadolf), also titled Grand Prince of Finland
1632–1654 : Christina of Sweden (Kristiina), also titled Grand Princess of Finland

The House of Palatinate-Zweibrücken

1654–1660 : Charles X Gustav (Kaarle X Kustaa), also titled Grand Prince of Finland
1660–1697 : Charles XI (Kaarle XI), also titled Grand Prince of Finland
1697–1718 : Charles XII (Kaarle XII), also titled Grand Prince of Finland
1719–1720 : Ulrika Eleonora of Sweden (Ulriika Eleonoora), also titled Grand Princess of Finland

The House of Hesse
1720–1751 : Frederick I of Sweden (Fredrik I), also titled Grand Prince of Finland

The House of Holstein-Gottorp

1751–1771 : Adolph Frederick (Aadolf Fredrik), Grand Prince of Finland
1771–1792 : Gustav III (Kustaa III), Grand Prince of Finland
1792–1796 : Charles, duke of Södermanland as Regent (Södermanlannin herttua Kaarle)
1792–1809 : Gustav IV Adolph (Kustaa IV Aadolf), Grand Prince of Finland

Grand Principality of Finland in Russian Empire 1809–1917

The Grand Principality of Finland in the Russian Empire (1809–1917) with the Emperor of Russia as the Grand Prince of Finland (Suomen suuriruhtinas).

The House of Romanov

1809–1825 : Alexander I (Aleksanteri I)
1825–1855 : Nicholas I (Nikolai I)
1855–1881 : Alexander II (Aleksanteri II)
1881–1894 : Alexander III (Aleksanteri III)
1894–1917 : Nicholas II (Nikolai II)

Interim period 1917–1919

During the interregnum from the fall of Nicholas II to the end of the Finnish Civil War in spring 1918, sovereignty in Finland was exercised by the Finnish Parliament and, until the October Revolution and the declaration of independence, the Russian interim government. After the civil war, regents (valtionhoitaja) were appointed by the parliament and a new king elected.

In May 1918, President Woodrow Wilson stated that the U.S. “shall be willing to recognize the Republic of Finland only when she shows that she is not controlled by Germany, as she now seems to be".

Regents appointed by parliament
 27 May 1918 – 12 December 1918 : Pehr Evind Svinhufvud
 12 December 1918 – 26 July 1919 : Baron Carl Gustaf Emil Mannerheim

The House of Hesse

|-
| Fredrik Kaarle9 October 191814 December 1918()
| 
| 1868PrussiaSon of Frederick William, Landgrave of Hesseand Princess Anna of Prussia
| Princess Margaret of Prussia18936 children
| 28 May 1940KasselAged 72
| King-elect of Finland
|}

List of presidents (1919–present) 
The president of Finland is Finland's head of state. Under the Constitution of Finland, executive power is vested in the president and the government, with the president possessing limited powers.

See also
 Ancient kings of Finland
Duke of Finland
 Governor-General of Finland
 King of Kvenland
 List of Danish monarchs
 List of Greenlandic rulers
 List of Norwegian monarchs
 List of rulers of Iceland
 List of Russian monarchs
 List of Swedish governors-general
 List of Swedish monarchs
 Monarchy of Finland
 President of Finland
 Prime Minister of Finland

References

Finland